German submarine U-105 was a Type IXB U-boat of Nazi Germany's Kriegsmarine. She was ordered on 24 May 1938 as part of Germany's naval rearmament program. Her keel was laid down in Bremen on 16 November 1938. After roughly seven months of construction, she was launched on 15 June 1940 and formally commissioned into the Kriegsmarine on 10 September 1940.

Construction and design

Construction

U-105 was ordered by Nazi Germany's Kriegsmarine on 24 May 1938; her keel was laid down on 16 November 1938 by DeSchiMAG AG Weser in Bremen as yard number 968. She was launched on 15 June 1940 and commissioned on 10 September under the command of Kapitänleutnant Georg Schewe.

Design
German Type IXB submarines were slightly larger than the original German Type IX submarines, later designated IXA. U-105 had a displacement of  when at the surface and  while submerged. She had two shafts and two  propellers.

U-105 was fitted with six  torpedo tubes (four fitted at the bow and two at the stern), 22 torpedoes, one  SK C/32 naval gun, 180 rounds, and a  SK C/30 as well as a  C/30 anti-aircraft gun. The boat had a complement of forty-eight.

Service history
Under the command of Kapitänleutnant Georg Schewe, U-105 left Kiel on 24 December 1940. She spent 39 days in the North Sea. During this patrol, she sank the British ship Bassano on 9 January 1941, and Lurigethan, part of Convoy SL-61, on 26 January 1941, totalling . Five days later, on 31 January, U-105 arrived at the German-occupied port of Lorient, France, which would remain her home port for the rest of her career.

1941
U-105 left Lorient on her second patrol on 22 February 1941 and underwent a 112-day voyage in the Atlantic Ocean. During this attack, U-105 sank the merchant ship Harmodius, on 8 March. Collectively, the two U-boats sank a total of 28,148 tons. U105 then stalked Convoy SL-68, sinking Medjerda
 on 18 March, Mandalika on 19 March
 and Clan Ogilvy, Benwyvis and Jhelum,
 all on the 21st. U-105 went on to score Nazi Germany's first kill off the coast of South America when she sank Ena de Larrinaga on 5 April 1941. Later during the patrol she sank Oakdene, part of Convoy OG-59. On 6 May, Benvrackie, part of Convoy OB 312; on the 13th, Benvenue part of Convoy OB 314 and on the 15th, Rodney Star on 16 May and Scottish Monarch on 1 June
 as part of Convoy OB 319. On 5 May 1941, the 105mm deck gun exploded, wounding six crew members. U-105 returned to Lorient on 13 June, and remained there until 3 August, when she departed on her third war patrol.

On 5 August she was assigned to wolfpack 'Hammer' and remained with it until it was disbanded on 12 August, when she was reassigned to wolfpack 'Grönland', with which she remained until its disbanding on 27 August. She was then assigned to wolfpack 'Margrave', and sank the Panamanian merchant ship Montana,
 part of Convoy SC 42, on 11 September. She returned to Lorient nine days later.
U-105 left Lorient on her fourth patrol on 8 November 1941 and spent 36 days in the North Atlantic. On 14 November she was assigned to wolfpack 'Steuben' and remained with it until 2 December. Having sunk no ships during the patrol, she returned to Lorient on 13 December 1941. Georg Schewe left the boat shortly after this patrol, and was replaced as commander by Heinrich Schuch.

1942
On 25 January 1942 U-105 left Lorient on her fifth patrol. On 31 January she sank the British warship , part of Convoy SL 98, south-west of Ireland, and, on 5 February 1942, she rescued seven men from a crashed German Dornier Do 24 350 miles off the coast of France. U-105 returned to Lorient on 8 February. Seventeen days later, on 25 February, U-105 left Lorient. Between 25 and 27 March, she sank the British merchant ship Narragansett and the Norwegian merchant ship Svenør off the east coast of the United States. U-105 returned to Lorient on 15 April after spending 50 days in the North Atlantic, and left on another patrol on 7 June. While crossing the Bay of Biscay, she was attacked by an Australian Short Sunderland aircraft from No. 10 Squadron RAAF. U-105 sought shelter in Ferrol, Spain and did not leave until 28 June, when she departed for Lorient, which she reached on the 30th. The attack apparently caused serious damage, as she did not sail again until 23 November. During this period, Oberleutnant zur See Hans-Adolf Schweichel was put in command of the boat, but did not undertake any patrols and was replaced by Oberleutnant zur See Jürgen Nissen, under whose command U-105 left Lorient.

While patrolling the North Atlantic she succeeded in sinking three British merchant ships; Orfor
 on 14 December 1942, C.S. Flight on 12 January 1943, and British Vigilance, part of Convoy TM 1, on 24 January, as well as the American freighter Cape Decision on the 27th. U-105 returned to Lorient on 14 February, and remained there until 16 March. During this patrol, (on 1 April), the boat's commander, Jürgen Nissen, was promoted to Kapitänleutnant. On 15 May 1943 U-105 sank the Greek merchant ship Maroussio Logothetis
 250 miles southwest of Freetown. On 2 June 1943, while passing close to Dakar, U-105 was attacked and sunk by a Potez-CAMS 141 flying boat "Antarés" from Free French Squadron 141. All 53 crew members were killed.

Summary of raiding history

References

Notes

Citations

Bibliography

External links

1940 ships
Ships built in Bremen (state)
World War II submarines of Germany
German Type IX submarines
U-boats commissioned in 1940
U-boats sunk by depth charges
U-boats sunk by French aircraft
World War II shipwrecks in the Atlantic Ocean
U-boats sunk in 1943
Ships lost with all hands
Maritime incidents in June 1943